Guzmania confinis is a plant species in the genus Guzmania. This species is native to Venezuela, Colombia and Peru.

References

confinis
Flora of South America
Plants described in 1951